The Secret Garden is an opera by Nolan Gasser with a libretto (based on the 1911 novel by Frances Hodgson Burnett) written by Carey Harrison. Commissioned by the San Francisco Opera and presented in partnership with Cal Performances, it premiered on March 1, 2013, at Zellerbach Hall at the University of California, Berkeley.

Roles

Critical reception 
The opera received positive reviews from Joshua Kosman in the San Francisco Chronicle, Janos Gereben in The San Francisco Examiner and San Francisco Classical Voice, Stacy Trevenon at StageandCinema.com and others, with mixed reviews from the San Jose Mercury News and elsewhere.

References

Operas
English-language operas
2013 operas
Operas based on novels
Operas set in England